Maesycoed is a settlement to the south and west of Pontypridd town centre in the county borough of Rhondda Cynon Taf, Wales. Maesycoed is a district in the town of Pontypridd within the Rhondda electoral ward and is bounded by Graig to the south, Pwllgwaun to the east and Hopkinstown and Mynydd Gelliwion to the north.

Villages in Rhondda Cynon Taf